DXFO (103.9 FM), on-air as 103.9 Marian Radio, is a radio station owned by Fairwaves Broadcasting Network and operated by Birhen Sa Kota Broadcasting. The station's studio and transmitter are located at Our Lady of Fatima Parish, Hayes St., Brgy. Camaman-an, Cagayan de Oro. As part of the local marketing agreement, it is an affiliate of Radyo Bandera for its news and talk programming.

References

Radio stations in Cagayan de Oro
Radio stations established in 2016